The 1949 Norwegian Football Cup was the 44th season of the Norwegian annual knockout football tournament. The tournament was open for all members of NFF, except those from Northern Norway. The final was played at Ullevaal Stadion in Oslo on 23 October 1949, and was contested by the defending champions Sarpsborg and the one-time former winners Skeid. Sarpsborg successfully defended their title with a 3–1 victory, securing their fifth Norwegian Cup trophy.

First round

|-
|colspan="3" style="background-color:#97DEFF"|Replay

|}

Second round

|-
|colspan="3" style="background-color:#97DEFF"|Replay

|}

Third round

|colspan="3" style="background-color:#97DEFF"|31 July 1949

|-
|colspan="3" style="background-color:#97DEFF"|Replay: 10 August 1949

|}

Fourth round

|colspan="3" style="background-color:#97DEFF"|28 August 1949

|-
|colspan="3" style="background-color:#97DEFF"|Replay: 11 September 1949

|}

Quarter-finals

|colspan="3" style="background-color:#97DEFF"|25 September 1949

|-
|colspan="3" style="background-color:#97DEFF"|Replay: 2 October 1949

|}

Semi-finals

|colspan="3" style="background-color:#97DEFF"|9 October 1949

|-
|colspan="3" style="background-color:#97DEFF"|Replay: 16 October 1949

|}

Final

See also
1948–49 Norwegian Main League
1949 in Norwegian football

References

Norwegian Football Cup seasons
Norway
Cup